Palace Modello was built in 1885 in Rijeka, Croatia, on the place of the destroyed and demolished Adamichev theater.

The palace was designed by the Viennese buro Fellner & Helmer led by Ferdinand Fellner and Herman Helmer. Building commenced in 1883 and completed in 1885.

The palace was built for the Rijeka Bank and cashboxes of the Savings Banks. The Palace Modello has luxurious facade. It is rich in decorative elements in the style of the late renaissance and baroque. Decorative items were maden by the sculptor Ignazio Donegani.

Modelo Palace is situated within sight of the Croatian National Theatre in honor Ivan Zajc, which was built in 1885 by the Buro Fellner & Helmer to replace the destroyed Adamichev theater.

Attractive gala hall, which is now an audience of Italian Cultural Club, decorated with magnificent stucco.

The public library of Rijeka city is currently operating on the ground floor.

References 

Buildings and structures in Rijeka
Fellner & Helmer buildings
Buildings and structures completed in 1885
1885 establishments in Croatia
Theatres in Rijeka